This is a list of cricket grounds in Bangladesh.  The grounds included in this list have held first-class, List-A and Twenty20 matches.  Additionally, some have hosted Test matches, One Day Internationals and Twenty20 Internationals.

International contribution by Bangladesh grounds 
Listed in order of match first used for international match

Updated: 7 February 2021

Test grounds

Active Test grounds
Listed in order of date first used for Test match

Former Test grounds

Non-Test grounds

Under construction

See also
Stadiums in Bangladesh
Sher-e-Bangla Cricket Stadium

References

External links
Cricket grounds in Bangladesh at CricketArchive.

Bangladesh
Grounds